Montastruc is a commune in the Tarn-et-Garonne department in the Occitanie region in southern France.

Note that Montrastruc is not the site of the "Montastruc rock shelter" in which prehistoric remains have been found in Bruniquel.  (These include the carving of the Swimming Reindeer which is held by the British Museum and which was included in A History of the World in 100 Objects and the Mammoth spear thrower.)

See also
Communes of the Tarn-et-Garonne department

References

Communes of Tarn-et-Garonne